The Young Ones is a 1973 Taiwanese film, spoken in Mandarin. The film was adapted into screenplay by Chang Yung-hsiang from the novel of the similar Chinese name by Chiung Yao. It was directed by Li Hsing. It stars Chen Chen (甄珍) and Alan Tang. The music was conducted by Zuo Hong Yuan (左宏元). In the film, the man falls in love with a physically frail woman, who later dies. Then he meets another woman, who looks similar to her.

Chiung Yao's novels, caiyun fei and hai'ou fei chu (海鷗飛處), were adapted into one 1980s television series, hai'ou fei chu caiyun fei (海鷗飛處彩雲飛) (Eng. Seagulls Soaring In Iridescent Clouds).

Soundtrack
Caiyun fei (彩雲飛) is a 1973 soundtrack by Teresa Teng, You Ya (尤雅), and Wan Sha-lang (萬沙浪), released by Life Records (丽风唱片). All songs were composed by Koo Yue (古月) except track ten, whose composer remains anonymous. Except tracks nine and ten, all songs are theme songs of the film. Lyrics from the titular song and "How Can I Leave You?" (我怎能離開你) are similar. "Thousand Words" (千言萬語) and "How Can I Leave You?" were re-recorded by Polydor Records (Hong Kong) for Teresa Teng's 1977 album Greatest Hits. Songs from the soundtrack have been later rendered by other singers.

Teresa Teng EP
All songs by Teresa Teng were also released by Lee Fung Records into a 7" EP vinyl plus another track not heard in the film.

Side one
 "How Can I Leave You?" (我怎能離開你)
 "Lonely Love" (愛的寂寞)
Side two
 "Thousand Words" (千言萬語)
 "Good Wine and Coffee" (美酒加咖啡 meijiu jia kafei)

External links
 
 
 The Young Ones at Douban

1973 films
Taiwanese romantic drama films
1970s Mandarin-language films
Films directed by Li Hsing
Films based on works by Chiung Yao
Films with screenplays by Chang Yung-hsiang